A Scream in the Streets (Girls in the Streets)
is a 1973 crime drama movie by producer Harry H. Novak and director Carl Monson, from a screenplay by Eric Norden. The cast includes Joshua Bryant, Sharon Kelly, Frank Bannon, Linda York and Angela Carnon. The film tells the story of two detectives who try to track down a gruesome murderer-rapist in the Los Angeles area. Their task is made more difficult because the perpetrator is able to impersonate a woman. The film contains a great deal of nudity and explicit sex scenes. It runs for 90 minutes and was released on DVD by Image Entertainment.

References

External links

1970s crime drama films
1970s English-language films